Events from the year 1682 in Denmark.

Incumbents
 Monarch – Christian V
 Grand Chancellor – Frederik Ahlefeldt

Events
 The French theater company La troupe du Roi de Danemark is opened as the theater of the royal court and the first and only permanent theater in Denmark for forty years onward.

Births
 13 September – Jacob Kærup, theologian (died 1751)
 Unknown date – Zacharias Allewelt, sea captain (died 1744)

Deaths
 8 February – Robert Robartes, Viscount Bodmin, British ambassador to Denmark (b. 1634)
 21 May – Reinhold von Hoven, military officer (b. c. 1610)
 23 May – Abraham Wuchters, painter and engraver (b. 1608)

References

 
Denmark
Years of the 17th century in Denmark